The Morristown Field Club is a sports and social club located in Morristown, New Jersey. It was created in 1881 as the Morristown Lawn Tennis Club. It is the third oldest tennis club in New Jersey after the Seabright Lawn Tennis and Cricket Club and the Orange Lawn Tennis Club.

History
In 1893, the club was renamed the Morristown Field Club and offered baseball, football as well as cricket.

In 1895, women were allowed to become members and paid $5 in annual dues. In 1897 an annual horse show was introduced. In 1900 the club joined the New Jersey Lawn Tennis Association, and in 1905 the club hosted the first New Jersey State Tennis Tournament, an event held each year up until 1916. In 1921 the club held a benefit tennis exhibition with Bill Tilden. In 1941 the club moved to 168 James Street. The land was purchased from the widow of Robert D. Foote. A new club house was built and the club switched to tennis as its only sport.

Notable members included Caroline Foster

External links

References

1881 establishments in New Jersey
American club cricket teams
Equestrian venues in the United States
Morristown, New Jersey
Sports clubs in the United States
Sports venues completed in 1881
Sports venues in New Jersey
Tennis venues in New Jersey
Cricket in New Jersey